Ustymenko or Ustimenko is a Ukrainian surname. Notable people with the surname include:

 Danil Ustimenko (born 2000), Kazakhstani footballer
 Denys Ustymenko (born 1999), Ukrainian footballer
 Iryna Ustymenko (born 1957), Ukrainian swimmer
 Lena Ustymenko (born 1986), Ukrainian volleyball player

See also
 
 

Ukrainian-language surnames